The following is a list of Hadīth collections, which are sources that contain the sayings, acts or tacit approvals, validly or invalidly, ascribed to the Islamic prophet Muhammad, and collected by Muhaddiths.

Sunni collections

 Kutub al-Sittah, the Six Canonical Books of Hadith. 
 Sahih al-Bukhari 
 Sahih Muslim
 Sunan Abu Dawood 
 Sunan al-Tirmidhi
 Sunan al-Nasa'i 
 Sunan ibn Majah

 Other Primary/Major Collections (Primary Hadith books are those books which are collected and written by author or their students themselves).
 Muwatta Imam Malik
 Kitab-ul-Aathaar - al Shaybani
 Kitab-ul-Aathaar - Abu Yusuf
 Musnad Abu Hanifa
 Musannaf Abd al Razzaq
 Sunan ad-Darimi
 Musnad Ahmad ibn Hanbal
 Saheeh Ibn Khuzaymah
 Sahih Ibn Hibban
 Al-Mustadrak alaa al-Sahihain of Imam Hakim (Talkhis al-Mustadrak)
 Al-Mu'jam al-Kabir of Al-Tabarani
 Al-Mu'jam al-Awsat of Al-Tabarani
 Al-Mu'jam as-Saghir of Al-Tabarani
 Musnad al Tayalisi
 Musnad Abu Awaanah
 Musannaf Ibn Abi Shaybah
 Musannaf of Abd al-Razzaq
 Al-Adab al-Mufrad
 Sunan al-Bayhaqi of al-Bayhaqi
 Shu'ab al-Iman of al-Bayhaqi
 Shamaail Tirmidhi (Shama'il Muhammadiyah of Tirmidhi)
 Musannaf ibn Jurayj
 Sunan al-Kubra lil Nasa'i
 Sahifah Hammam ibn Munabbih
 Tahdhib al-Athar
 Musnad Imam ul A’zam
 Musnad al-Shafi'i
 Musnad al-Siraj
 Musnad al-Firdous
 Musnad Abu Ya'la
 Sunan Sa'id ibn Mansur
 Khasais of Amir Al Momenin
 Sunan Dar Al-Qutni
 Musnad Humaidi Imam Al-Humaydi
 Musnad Ishaq Ibn Rahwayh
 Musnad al-Bazzar
 Sunan al-Wusta
 Secondary books of Hadiths (Secondary Hadith books are those books that have been selected, compiled, and collated from the Primary Hadith books and are not original collections.)
 Jami ul Kamil of Imam Azmi (All Authentic Hadiths in one book)
 At-Targhib wat-Tarhib
 Mishkat al-Masabih
 Masabih al-Sunnah
 Riyadh al-Saaliheen (The Meadows of the Righteous)
 Bulugh al-Maram (Achievement of the Goal)
 Majma al-Zawa'id
 Kanz al-Ummal 
 Zujajat al-Masabih
 Al-Mawdū'āt Al-Kubrā (A Great Collection of Fabricated Traditions)
 Jami'al Ahadith of Shaykh al-Islam Ala Hazrat Imam-e-Ahle Sunnat Imam Ahmed Raza Khan
 Al-Minhaj-us-Sawi Min Al-Hadith An-Nabavi of Shaykh al-Islam Dr. Muhammad Tahir-ul-Qadri
 Hidayat-ul-Ummah Ala Minhaj-ul-Quran Was Sunnah of Shaykh al-Islam Dr. Muhammad Tahir-ul-Qadri
 Ma'arij-us-Sunan Lin Najat Min Az Zalal Wal Fitan of Shaykh al-Islam Dr. Muhammad Tahir-ul-Qadri
 Jami as-Saghir of Imam as-Suyuti
 Silsilah Ahadith as-Sahihah of Shaykh al-Albani
 al-Jami' as-Sahih Mimma Laysa Fi As-Sahihahyn of Muqbil bin Hadi al-Wadi'i

 Muntakhab Ahadith

Shia collections
 Al-Kutub Al-Arb'ah, the Four books
 Kitab al-Kafi of Kulayni (divided into Usul al-Kafi, Furu al-Kafi and Rawdat al-Kafi)
Man La Yahduruhu al-Faqih of Shaikh Saduq
 Tahdhib al-Ahkam of Shaikh Tusi
 Al-Istibsar of Shaikh Tusi

 Primary Hadith Collection (Primary Hadith books are those books which are collected, compiled and written by author or their students themselves).
 The Book of Sulaym ibn Qays by Sulaym ibn Qays
 Kitab ul Momin by Hussain bin Saeed Ahwazi
 Al-Mahasin by Ahmad b. Muhammad al-Barqi
 Qurb al-isnad by Abd Allah b. Ja'far al-Himyari
 Al-Amali of Shaikh Tusi
 Al-Amali of Shaikh Saduq
 Al-Tawhid of Shaikh Saduq
 Uyoun Akhbar al-Ridha by Shaykh Saduq
 Tuhaf al-Uqul by Ibn Shu'ba Harrani
 Al-Amali of Shaikh Mufid
 Al-Amali of Al-Sharif al-Murtada
 Nahj al-Balaghah by Al-Sharif al-Radi
 Khasais of Al Aemmah by Al-Sharif al-Radi
 Daim al-Islam by Al-Qadi al-Nu'man
 Al-Ihtijaj by Abu Mansur Ahmad Tabrisi
 Kamil al-Ziyarat by Ibn Qulawayh
 Al Saqib Fi al-Manâqib by Ibn Hamaza Tusi
 Basâ'ir al-darajât by Sheikh Al-Safar al-Qummi

 Books of the Infallibles
 Tafseer Quran by Imam Ali
 Book of Fatimah by Bibi Fatimah
 Al-Sahifa al-Sajjadiyya by Ali ibn Husayn Zayn al-Abidin 
 Risalah al-Huquq by Ali ibn Husayn Zayn al-Abidin 
 Sahifat al-Ridha by Ali al-Ridha
 Al-Risalah al-Dhahabiah by Ali al-Ridha 
  by Imam Hasan al-Askari (Doubts about Authenticity)

 Secondary books of Hadiths (Secondary Hadith books are those books which are not collected, compiled and written by author himself but rather they are selected from already existing Hadith books i.e Primary Hadith books)
 Al-Wafi by Mohsen Fayz Kashani
 Wasā'il al-Shīʿa by Shaikh al-Hur al-Aamili
 Bihar al-Anwar by Allama Majlesi 
 Haq ul-Yaqeen by Allama Majlisi 
 Ayn al-Hayat by Allama Majlisi
 Ghurar al-Hikam wa Durar al-Kalim by Abdul Wahid al-Tamimi
 Mustadrak al-wasa'il by Mirza Husain Noori Tabarsi
 Safinat al-bihar by Shaykh Abbas Qumi
 Mustadrak safinat al-bihar by Shaykh 'Ali Namazi
 Jami' ahadith al-Shi'a by Hossein Borujerdi
 Nahj-al feṣāḥa by Abul Qasem Payandeh
  by Mohammad Reyshahri
  by Muhammad Rida Hakimi

Ibadi collections

 Jami Sahih
 Tartib al-Musnad

See also
List of Sunni books
List of Shia books
List of Islamic texts

Hadith
Islam-related lists